Edward McLarty (1 December 1848 – 13 August 1917) was an Australian pastoralist and politician who was a member of the Legislative Council of Western Australia from 1894 to 1916, representing South-West Province.

McLarty was born in Pinjarra, in Western Australia's Peel region. His brother, John Pollard McLarty, was also a member of parliament. Prominent in agricultural circles, he was elected to the Murray Road Board in 1875 (on which he would serve for most of the rest of his life), and was also appointed a justice of the peace. McLarty was elected to parliament at the 1894 Legislative Council elections, which were the first for that body under responsible government. His initial term was for four years, but at all subsequent elections (in 1898, 1904, and 1910) he was elected to six-year terms. McLarty left parliament in 1916, and died in Pinjarra the following year, aged 69. He had married Mary Jane Campbell in 1873, with whom he had seven children. One of his sons was Sir Ross McLarty, who was Premier of Western Australia from 1947 to 1953.

References

1848 births
1917 deaths
Australian pastoralists
Members of the Western Australian Legislative Council
People from Pinjarra, Western Australia
Western Australian local councillors
19th-century Australian businesspeople